Novo Lino is a municipality located in the Brazilian state of Alagoas. Its population is 12,764 (2020) and its area is 182 km².

References

Municipalities in Alagoas